The Darwin Coastal, an IBRA bioregion, is located in the Northern Territory of Australia.

Geography

This Interim Biogeographic Regionalisation for Australia (IBRA) bioregion is generally flat, low-lying coastlands, drained by several large rivers. Vegetation communities include eucalypt forest and woodlands with tussock grass and hummock grass understorey.

See also

References

Arnhem Land
Arnhem Land tropical savanna
Coastline of the Northern Territory
IBRA regions
Timor Sea
Darwin, Northern Territory